Israel Salazar Piriz (born 10 May 2003) is a Spanish footballer currently playing as a forward for UCAM Murcia, on loan from Real Madrid Castilla.

Club career
Born in Badajoz, Spain, Salazar played for Guadalupe, San Roque and Flecha Negra before joining the youth ranks of Real Madrid in 2015. He progressed well through the academy, never scoring less than 16 goals in a season, and reached a landmark 150 goals in 2020. In October 2020, due to these stellar performances, he was named by English newspaper The Guardian as one of the best players born in 2003 worldwide.

He was loaned to Segunda Federación side UCAM Murcia in August 2022.

International career
Salazar has represented Spain at under-16 and under-17 level.

Career statistics

Club

Notes

References

2003 births
Living people
Sportspeople from Badajoz
Spanish footballers
Spain youth international footballers
Association football forwards
Segunda División B players
Primera Federación players
Segunda Federación players
CD San Roque footballers
Real Madrid CF players
Real Madrid Castilla footballers
UCAM Murcia CF players